Danry Josué Vásquez Blanco (born January 8, 1994) is a Venezuelan professional baseball outfielder for the Sioux City Explorers of the American Association of Professional Baseball. In 2010, the Detroit Tigers signed Vásquez as an international free agent.

Career

Detroit Tigers
In 2010, the Detroit Tigers signed Vásquez as an international free agent, giving him a $1.2 million signing bonus. Vásquez began the 2012 season with the West Michigan Whitecaps of the Class A Midwest League, but he struggled and was demoted to the Connecticut Tigers of the Class A-Short Season New York–Penn League.

After weighing , Vásquez gained  during the 2012–13 offseason. He began the 2013 season with West Michigan, where he had a .281 batting average with five home runs and 39 runs batted in.

Houston Astros
On July 29, 2013, the Tigers traded Vásquez and a player to be named later (David Paulino) to the Houston Astros for José Veras. The Astros assigned Vásquez to the Quad Cities River Bandits of the Midwest League. In 2014, Vásquez played for the Lancaster JetHawks of the Class A-Advanced California League. He spent the 2015 season with the Single-A Lancaster JetHawks and Double-A Corpus Christi Hooks, batting .272/.321/.364 between the two clubs. Vásquez began the 2016 season with Corpus Christi, and hit .265/.322/.374 in 60 games for the club before his release on August 7, 2016.

Vásquez signed with the Lancaster Barnstormers of the Atlantic League of Professional Baseball, an independent baseball league, for the 2018 season in January. On March 23, 2018, Vázquez was released after video footage of a domestic violence incident involving him were released.

Piratas de Campeche
On May 4, 2018, Vásquez signed with the Piratas de Campeche of the Mexican League. He hit .289/.388/.459 with 7 home runs and 35 RBI in 72 games. He became a free agent following the 2018 season.

On March 23, 2019, Vásquez signed with the Algodoneros de San Luis of the Liga Norte de México.

Rieleros de Aguascalientes
On July 29, 2019, Vásquez signed with the Rieleros de Aguascalientes of the Mexican League. In 26 games for Aguascalientes, Vásquez .279/.370/.538 with 7 home runs and 17 RBI. After the 2019 season, he played for Tiburones de La Guaira of the Liga Venezolana de Béisbol Profesional(LVMP). In 2020, he did not play a game because of the cancellation of the Mexican League season due to the COVID-19 pandemic. After the 2020 season, he played for Tiburones of the LVMP. He has also played for Venezuela in the 2021 Caribbean Series. He appeared in 25 games for Aguascalientes in 2021, slashing .279/.414/.494 with 4 home runs and 16 RBI.

Sioux City Explorers
On May 2, 2022, Vásquez signed with the Sioux City Explorers of the American Association of Professional Baseball.

Domestic violence incident
In 2016, while playing for the Corpus Christi Hooks of the Class AA Texas League, Vásquez was arrested on suspicion of assault and domestic violence, after video cameras at Whataburger Field caught him assaulting his now ex-girlfriend Fabiana Pérez in a stairwell. According to Perez, Vásquez saw her talking to a male friend at the stadium and got upset. The attack left her with a fractured nose and bruises. Perez did not press charges. although she said that was not the first time he was violent with her. Major League Baseball placed Vásquez on administrative leave. The Astros subsequently released Vásquez. The domestic violence charge was dismissed by prosecutors after Vásquez paid an undisclosed fine, underwent community service, and took anger management classes. Vásquez and Perez initially got back together after the assault, but their relationship deteriorated soon after. Vásquez has since married another woman.

Vásquez was released from the Lancaster Barnstormers on March 13, 2018, before the season began, after video footage of the domestic violence incident was released to the public.

References

External links

1994 births
Living people
Algodoneros de San Luis players
Connecticut Tigers players
Corpus Christi Hooks players
Gulf Coast Tigers players
Lancaster JetHawks players
Leones del Caracas players
Mexican League baseball center fielders
People from Ocumare del Tuy
Piratas de Campeche players
Quad Cities River Bandits players
Rieleros de Aguascalientes players
Tiburones de La Guaira players
Venezuelan expatriate baseball players in Mexico
Venezuelan expatriate baseball players in the United States
West Michigan Whitecaps players